Grandparent visitation is a legal right that grandparents in some jurisdictions may have to have court-ordered contact (or visitation) with their grandchildren.

United States
In the United States, most states have statutes that describe when a third party, such as a grandparent, may ask a court to grant them the legal right to maintain ongoing contact with somebody else's child. Many states have laws that specifically address the rights of grandparents. However, a federal Supreme Court decision called Troxel v. Granville places limits on when states can grant visitation rights to third parties, including grandparents.

State laws vary greatly, and no state guarantees that the grandparents will be able to obtain a court order granting them visitation, unless it is in the best interests of the child. The rationale behind these laws is that sometimes, especially with the death of a parent or in a family that has undergone divorce, the children may not have the opportunity to have contact with the non-custodial parent and his relatives, thus fostering continued familial bonds. Those opposing this view say that court-ordered grandparent visitation infringes upon the fundamental right of fit parents to raise their child in the manner that they see fit (including the right to decide with whom the child will associate). Grandparent's rights to see their grandchildren, following death, divorce, child born out of wedlock, or where the child does not reside in the home of a parent, was first created by Bloomfield Hills, Michigan Family Law Attorney, Richard S. Victor who later went on to form the national nonprofit Grandparents Rights Organization (GRO) in the early 1980s and which still exists today.

In mosts states grandparent rights exists however, the grandparent must obtain their own attorney. They will not be awarded an assigned counsel.

Organizations, like the Grandparents Rights Organization, are working on some changes in the law to provide grandparents automatic visitation upon the death of a parent (their child) to allow for continued family interaction with that part of their family.

Impact of Troxel v. Granville
In the case of Troxel v. Granville, the United States Supreme Court stated that "the interest of parents in the care, custody and control of their children--is perhaps the oldest of the fundamental liberty interests recognized by this Court." The Supreme Court also made it clear that this fundamental right is implicated in grandparent visitation cases. The plurality opinion stated at the outset that statutes allowing grandparent visitation orders to be imposed over parental objection "present questions of constitutional import." However, the court clearly held that the states that did have grandparent visitation laws would not be held unconstitutional on their face, as requested in the case.  The Supreme Court declared that a parent's fundamental right to the "care, custody and control of their children" was "at issue in this case." They held that in order for state laws to be constitutional, three things need to be in the law: 1) If there is a claim or action filed, it is the grandparent that has the burden of proof; 2) The court should give "deference" to a "fit" parent's decision; and 3) The grandparent may still proceed with their request for grandparent visitation and overcome being denied contact; and each state should have a set of factors for the court to evaluate when deciding to either grant or deny a grandparent's request, over a parent's objections. The Supreme Court struck down the Washington visitation statute because it was not their grandparent visitation statute that was being evaluated and the statute that the grandparent filed under was "over broad" and too excessive. Prior to the case being heard by the US Supreme Court, the state legislature in Washington repealed the law in question, but allowed their grandparent visitation law to remain in place, as that law was never challenged in the case.

State courts considering non-parent visitation petitions must apply "a presumption that fit parents act in the best interests of their children.". Troxel requires that state courts must give "deference" or some special weight to a fit parent's decision to deny non-parent visitation. "Choices [parents make] about the upbringing of children... are among constitutional rights, but were not an absolute right... sheltered by the Fourteenth Amendment against the State's unwarranted usurpation, disregard, or disrespect." This principle must inform the understanding of the "special weight" that Troxel requires courts to give to parents' decisions concerning whether, when and how grandparents will associate with their children. Even though Troxel does not define "special weight," previous Supreme Court precedent indicates that "special weight" is a strong term signifying very considerable deference. The "special weight" requirement, as illuminated by these prior Supreme Court cases, means that the deference provided to the parent's wishes will be overcome only by some compelling governmental interest and by overwhelmingly clear factual circumstances supporting that governmental interest.

Italy
Limited grandparent visitation rights exist in Italy.

References

Family law in the United States